Don Johnson (born 1949) is an American actor.

Don or Donald Johnson may also refer to:


Sports
 Don Johnson (second baseman) (1911–2000), American baseball player
 Don Johnson (American football) (1920–1965), American football center and linebacker
 Don Johnson (skier) (1922–1951), American Olympic skier
 Don Johnson (pitcher) (1926–2015), American baseball player
 Don Johnson (sports executive) (1930–2012), Canadian sports executive and president of the Canadian Amateur Hockey Association
 Don Johnson (bowler) (1940–2003), American ten-pin bowler
 Donald Johnson (born 1968), American tennis player

Politicians and diplomats
 Donald Johnson (British politician) (1903–1978), British Member of Parliament
 Don Johnson Jr. (born 1948), U.S. Congressman from Georgia
 Donald C. Johnson (born 1949), American diplomat

Other people
 Donald E. Johnson (1924–1999), American businessman and government official
 Don L. Johnson (1927–2006), American writer
 Donald B. Johnson (1933–1994), American computer scientist
 Donald K. Johnson (born 1935), Canadian philanthropist
 Don Johnson (gambler) (born 1962), American blackjack player
 Donald Johnson, English musician and member of Manchester band A Certain Ratio

See also
 Don Johnson Big Band, a Finnish band
 Don Johnson Cup, the Junior “B” ice hockey championship for the Atlantic Provinces of Canada
 Donald Johnston (disambiguation)